The World Group was the highest level of Davis Cup competition in 1990. The first-round losers went into the Davis Cup World Group Qualifying Round, and the winners progressed to the quarterfinals and were guaranteed a World Group spot for 1991.

West Germany were the defending champions, but were eliminated in the quarterfinals.

The United States won the title, defeating Australia in the final, 3–2. The final was held at the Florida Suncoast Dome in St. Petersburg, Florida, United States, from 30 November to 2 December. It was the US team's 29th Davis Cup title overall and their first since 1982.

Participating teams

Draw

First round

West Germany vs. Netherlands

Argentina vs. Israel

New Zealand vs. Yugoslavia

Australia vs. France

Czechoslovakia vs. Switzerland

United States vs. Mexico

Spain vs. Austria

Italy vs. Sweden

Quarterfinals

Argentina vs. West Germany

Australia vs. New Zealand

Czechoslovakia vs. United States

Austria vs. Italy

Semifinals

Australia vs. Argentina

Austria vs. United States

Final

United States vs. Australia

References

External links
Davis Cup official website

World Group
Davis Cup World Group
Davis Cup